Alplaus Kill also called Aalplaats Creek is a river that flows into the Mohawk River in Alplaus, New York.

The name is derived from Dutch, most likely meaning "eel pond".

References

Rivers of Saratoga County, New York
Rivers of New York (state)
Rivers of Schenectady County, New York